Maximiliano Ezequiel Núñez (born September 17, 1986) is an Argentine football right winger who plays for Atlético Bucaramanga.

Career
Núñez played youth football at Estudiantes de La Plata, but was loaned to third division side Temperley in 2007, before debuting in Estudiantes' first team. In Temperley he played for one season, mainly as a forward.

Upon his return to Estudiantes, he made his Primera División debut starting in a 1–2 defeat to Racing on September 20, 2008, for the 2008 Apertura. He scored his first goal in a 5 to 1 victory over Independiente in the 2009 Clausura.

Núñez was part of Estudiantes 2009 Copa Libertadores winning squad, and was runner-up of the 2009 FIFA Club World Cup with the team. He started in the semifinals against Pohang Steelers and entered the field in the final against FC Barcelona. In 2010, the midfielder won his second title with Estudiantes, the 2010 Apertura of the Argentine Primera División. He played 4 games and scored 1 goal in the tournament.

Signed in July, 2011 for San Martín de San Juan one year on loan.

A six-month after playing for All Boys, Núñez agreed to join Peruvian side Sporting Cristal in December, 2013.

Honours
Estudiantes
Copa Libertadores (1): 2009
Argentine Primera División (1): 2010 Apertura

References

External links
  
 
 Signed to San Martin de San Juan Official website of San Martín de San Juan 
 

1986 births
Living people
Footballers from La Plata
Association football midfielders
Argentine footballers
Argentine Primera División players
Estudiantes de La Plata footballers
San Martín de San Juan footballers
Sporting Cristal footballers
Argentine expatriate footballers
Expatriate footballers in Peru